The Firestone hydroelectric power station is a hydroelectric power station in Liberia on the Farmington River. Built in 1942, it was the first power generating dam built in the country. Located in Harbel, Margibi County, it is operated by the Firestone Plantations Company.

Capacity
The project has a generating capacity of  produced by four turbines. Initial construction was in order to supply power to a United States military facility in the area during World War II and to supply the city of Robertsfield. The plant was the only hydro power facility to remain intact during the Civil Wars.

References

Margibi County
Hydroelectric power stations in Liberia
Dams completed in 1942
1942 establishments in Liberia